Mateo Antonio de Mendoza Díaz de Arce was a military leader and the governor of Nueva Vizcaya and Santa Fe de Nuevo Mexico in 1760. He was the interim governor between Francisco Antonio Marin del Valle and Manuel Portillo Urrisola.

Early life 

Mendoza's birthdate and birthplace are unknown. He was baptized on 28 September 1696 in Burgos, Spain, to Francisco Mendoza y Martínez de Fuidio and Teresa Díaz de Arce y Maeda. He was raised in a solar house in Villacarriedo, in the Spanish province of Santander.

By 1717 he had joined the Town Council in Ábalos, La Rioja. In 1751 Mendoza joined the Order of Santiago and served in the Spanish army, being a member of the Queens Dragoons as lieutenant colonel and sergeant major.

Career 

In 1753, King Charles IV of Spain appointed him governor of the Captaincy General of Nueva Vizcaya, New Spain. After assuming the charge of governor, he settled in Chihuahua (in the modern Mexico), where he resided until he ended his administration. During his administration, on 8 November 1758, he sent a troop led by  Manuel Antonio de San Juan to Carrizal, in the modern-day Ahumada Municipality, to found the Presidio of San Fernando de las Amarillas del Carrizal. In addition, Mendoza ordered the troops stationed in Carrazal to accompany and defend travelers from possible threats on the Camino Real on their way to New Mexico or from there to other places. Mendoza performed his duties as governor of Nueva Vizcaya until 1761.  

In 1761, Mendoza was appointed interim governor of New Mexico by Charles III to serve between Francisco Antonio Marin del Valle and Manuel Portillo Urrisola. Officially, he ruled only for few months, but no document confirms he was in New Mexico.

Mendoza married Cecilia Catalina Mendoza y Davalillo on 27 September 1714, in San Asensio, in the La Rioja (Spain).

References

Colonial governors of Santa Fe de Nuevo México